Bellburns is a fishing settlement in the Canadian province of Newfoundland and Labrador. The town holds strong economic ties with the two closest towns Daniels Harbour and Portland Creek.

Demographics 

See also
 List of cities and towns in Newfoundland and Labrador

References

Towns in Newfoundland and Labrador